Josef Matyáš Trenkwald (13 March 1824, Prague — 28 July 1897 Perchtoldsdorf) was a Czech/Austrian painter, best known for his religious and historical paintings. He is also known as "Josef Mathias von Trenkwald" and "Joseph Matthias Trenkwald".

Biography 
His father was a tax commissioner. He studied art with Christian Ruben at the Academy of Fine Arts, Prague from 1841 to 1851,  where he began painting scenes from Czech history, especially the era of the Hussite wars. In 1852, he moved to the Vienna Academy of Fine Arts and illustrated the Book of Songs by Heinrich Heine.

For five years, from 1856 to 1861, he lived in Rome on a scholarship. In 1865, he was appointed Director of the Academy in Prague and held that position until 1872, when he became a Professor at the Vienna Academy.

He is best known for his large canvases Leopold the Glorious enters Vienna on his return from the Cross campaign (1872),  Thomas Munzer, King Enzo, etc. In addition, Trenkwald created frescoes in several Vienna and Prague churches. Together with Karel Svoboda and Antonín Lhota, he decorated the "Belvedere Queen Anne" (a royal summer palace) with scenes from Czech history.

Selected paintings

References

External links

1824 births
1897 deaths
Austrian painters
Austrian male painters
Artists from Prague
History painters
19th-century Czech painters
19th-century Austrian male artists
Czech male painters
19th-century Czech male artists